Canthigaster leoparda, known as the leopard sharpnose puffer, is a species of pufferfish in the family Tetraodontidae. It is native to the Indo-Pacific, ranging from Christmas Island to the Philippines, Ambon, and Guam. It occurs at a depth range of 30 to 50 m (98 to 164 ft), and it is usually found in the vicinity of drop-offs and caves. It reaches 7.5 cm (3 inches) SL and is often seen either alone or in pairs. The species is known to be oviparous.

References 

leoparda
Fish described in 1979
Fish of the Philippines
Fish of the Indian Ocean